was a Japanese actress, model and tarento.

Biography
Kinjo was a 4th gen member of the official Tokyo Girls Collection running team "TOKYO GIRLS RUN". She was a fan of Japanese rock, particularly One Ok Rock. She had one younger brother. It was reported on June 12, 2017 that she was in the hospital for treatment of her illness. She then returned.

She had been resting since 2019 due to illness, but her agency Grick announced on December 5, 2020 that she had died on December 1, 2020. She was 24 years old.

Filmography

References

External links 

1996 births
2020 deaths
Japanese film actresses
Japanese television actresses
Japanese female models
Models from Okinawa Prefecture